The 2019 Monterrey Open (also known as the 2019 Abierto GNP Seguros for sponsorship reasons) was a women's tennis tournament played on outdoor hard courts. It was the 11th edition of the Monterrey Open and an International tournament on the 2019 WTA Tour. It took place at the Club Sonoma in Monterrey, Mexico, from 1 to 7 April 2019.

Points and prize money

Point distribution

Prize money 

*per team

Singles main draw entrants

Seeds 

1 Rankings as of 18 March 2019.

Other entrants 
The following players received wildcards into the main draw: 
  Giuliana Olmos
  Victoria Rodríguez  
  Renata Zarazúa

The following players received entry from the qualifying draw:
  Beatriz Haddad Maia 
  Miyu Kato
  Kristína Kučová
  Xu Shilin

The following players received entry as lucky losers:
  Gréta Arn
  Elena-Gabriela Ruse

Withdrawals
Before the tournament
  Eugenie Bouchard → replaced by  Harriet Dart
  Katie Boulter → replaced by  Gréta Arn
  Donna Vekić → replaced by  Olga Danilović
  Wang Yafan → replaced by  Ivana Jorović
  Dayana Yastremska → replaced by  Misaki Doi
  Vera Zvonareva → replaced by  Elena-Gabriela Ruse

Retirements
  Victoria Azarenka (right lower leg injury)

Doubles main draw entrants

Seeds 

 Rankings as of April 1, 2019.

Other entrants 
The following pairs received wildcards into the doubles main draw:
  Jovana Jakšić /  Renata Zarazúa
  Victoria Rodríguez /  Ana Sofía Sánchez

Withdrawals 
  Christina McHale (right finger injury)

Champions

Singles 

  Garbiñe Muguruza def.  Victoria Azarenka, 6–1, 3–1, ret.

Doubles 

  Asia Muhammad /  Maria Sanchez def.  Monique Adamczak /  Jessica Moore, 7–6(7–2), 6–4

References

External links 
 Official website

2019 WTA Tour
2019
2019 in Mexican tennis
April 2019 sports events in Mexico